The Yes Album is the third studio album by English progressive rock band Yes, released on 19 February 1971 by Atlantic Records. It was the band's first album to feature guitarist Steve Howe, who replaced Peter Banks in 1970, as well as their last to feature keyboardist Tony Kaye until 1983's 90125.

The band spent mid-1970 writing and rehearsing new material at a farmhouse at Romansleigh, Devon, and the new songs were recorded at Advision Studios in London in the autumn. The album was the first by the band to feature all-original material. While the album retained close harmony singing, Kaye's Hammond organ, and Chris Squire's melodic bass, as heard on earlier releases, the new material also covered further styles including jazz piano, funk, and acoustic music. All of the band members contributed ideas, and tracks were extended in length to allow music to develop. Howe contributed a variety of guitar styles, including a Portuguese guitar, and recorded the solo acoustic guitar piece "Clap", live at the Lyceum Theatre, London.

The album was a critical success and a major commercial breakthrough for Yes, who had been at risk of being dropped by Atlantic due to the commercial failures of their first two albums. It reached number 4 in the United Kingdom and number 40 in the United States, and was later certified platinum by the Recording Industry Association of America for surpassing one million copies. The album has been reissued on CD several times, and was given a Blu-ray release in 2014 remixed by Steven Wilson.

Background
Yes had already recorded two albums for Atlantic Records by mid-1970, but neither had been commercially successful and the label was considering dropping them. They had replaced founding member Banks with Howe, who enjoyed playing a wider variety of styles, including folk and country music, and played a mix of electric and acoustic guitars. Singer Jon Anderson later said that Howe could "jump from one thing to the other, very fast, very talented." After some warm-up gigs with Howe, the band moved to Devon to write and rehearse new material. They arrived at a cottage in Churchill, north of Barnstaple, but felt restricted there and were not allowed to make any noise after dark. Howe in particular enjoyed working on the farm, and eventually bought it. Following rehearsals, the band booked Advision Studios in London with producer Eddie Offord and spent the autumn recording. The band enjoyed the sessions, and soon had enough material ready for an album.

Several weeks into the Langley Farm rehearsals, manager Roy Flynn came to tell the band he was leaving them and taking money he believed he was owed. This put the band under severe financial stress, leaving concerts as their only source of income at the time. Flynn also owned 5 per cent of the band's publishing revenues in perpetuity; that was later terminated but it left the band bitter enough to retitle a short Bill Bruford instrumental on their next album, Fragile, "Five Per Cent For Nothing" in protest. He was soon replaced by Brian Lane.

On 23 November 1970, the group were involved in a head-on vehicle collision at Basingstoke, while returning from the previous evening's gig at the Plymouth Guildhall. The band all suffered shock, and Kaye's foot was fractured. He had to do the next few gigs, and the album cover's photo shoot, with it in plaster.

Howe mostly used a Gibson ES-175 semi-acoustic guitar and a Martin 00-18 acoustic for recording, though he did attempt to play a variety of styles with the two instruments. Kaye's main instruments were the Hammond organ and piano, including a solo on "A Venture". Kaye had previously played the Hammond M-100, but for this album used the B-3, a move which he saw as "a turning point". He was not interested in playing synthesizers, which had started to appear on the market. This proved to be a problem with the other members of the band, and Kaye thought his style conflicted too much with Howe's. He left the group during rehearsals for the follow-up album in mid-1971, to be replaced by Rick Wakeman.

Songs
Yes had started their career as a covers band, performing radical re-arrangements of hit songs, and their first two albums included covers in this vein. The Yes Album was the first to feature group-written material in its entirety. Some familiar elements remained: Anderson, Howe and Squire sang three-part vocal harmony throughout the record, while Squire's melodic bass and Bill Bruford's spacious drumming made up their unique rhythm section.

"Yours Is No Disgrace" originated from some lyrics written by Anderson with his friend David Foster. This was combined with other short segments of music written by the band in rehearsals. Howe worked out the opening guitar riff on his own while the rest of the band took a day's holiday. The backing track was recorded by the group in sections, then edited together to make up the final piece.

Howe's solo acoustic tune, "Clap" (incorrectly titled "The Clap" in original album pressings), was influenced by Chet Atkins and Mason Williams' "Classical Gas". The piece was written to celebrate the birth of Howe's son Dylan on 4 August 1969. The version that appears on the album was recorded live at the Lyceum Theatre in London on 17 July 1970. The studio take of the piece, which was added as a bonus track on the 2003 Rhino remaster, continues into a section that would return almost unaltered in Howe's next solo acoustic piece "Mood for a Day" on their next album, Fragile.

The spacey, electronic-sounding effect in "Starship Trooper" was achieved by running the guitar backing track through a flanger. Anderson wrote the bulk of the song, while Squire wrote the "Disillusion" section in the middle. The closing section, "Würm" is a continuous cadenza of chords (G-E-C) played ad lib. It evolved from a song called "Nether Street" by Howe's earlier group, Bodast.

"I've Seen All Good People" is a suite of two tunes. Anderson wanted the piece to start quietly and develop, leading into a large church organ sound, before moving into the funky second movement. The band had difficulty recording the initial "Your Move" section, which was resolved by making a tape loop of bass and drums, over which Howe overdubbed a Spanish laúd, miscrediting it as a "vachalia" on the album's credits. Gnidrolog's Colin Goldring played recorder on the track. The group also used a Dewtron bass pedal synthesiser on the track, which Anderson would then play in concert.

Anderson wrote "A Venture" in the studio; the song was then arranged by the rest of the band. Kaye played piano on the track, contributing a jazzy solo towards the end. Howe played a guitar solo on the original recording, but it was left off the final mix, which faded out just as it started. The song was never played live by the original group, but an arrangement was worked out when Yes decided to play the whole album live in 2013.

Anderson was inspired to write the lyrics for "Perpetual Change" by the view of the countryside from the cottage at Churchill. He thought of humans completing the moon landing at a time when "our own environment is all fouled up", and a space mission that involved an explosion on the moon to observe its thickness and the subsequent Pakistani floods in 1970. "So I was thinking, ok you knock the moon off its axis and you're going to mess up the world." The middle of the track features a polyrhythmic structure, where two pieces of music in different time signatures are playing simultaneously.

Artwork

The front cover was shot by Phil Franks the day after the Basingstoke gig accident. Franks had already taken some photos from the Lyceum gig, but felt he needed something more for the front cover. The band showed up late having been in hospital earlier that day, and only 30 minutes were available for a shoot. Unable to get a satisfactory photo in the studio, Franks took the band round to his flat, grabbed a polystyrene mannequin head from a bin, put a 1,000 watt bulb in the kitchen light fitting, and improvised the shot. Franks credited the sleeve designer, Rolling Stone art director Jon Goodchild, for making the cover a success. When Yes performed a live version of "Yours is No Disgrace" for the German television series Beat-Club in April 1971, footage of the band was combined with that of another mannequin head spinning over a chair, mimicking the cover's concept.

The inside of the album's gatefold sleeve shows Kaye playing a Hammond organ, while the front cover showed his leg in plaster, following the accident. Anderson is credited as "John Anderson" on the album but he had dropped the "h" from his first name by the next album, Fragile.

Release
The Yes Album was released in the UK on 19 February 1971. It was a commercial success and was the band's breakthrough album, selling around 60,000 copies upon release and reaching number 4 in the UK. and number 40 in the US. It has been certified Platinum by the Recording Industry Association of America for selling over one million copies.

At that time British postal workers were on strike, preventing record stores from sending sales reports to Melody Maker, which compiled the charts most followed by the music industry. Richard Branson owned a record store on Oxford Street in London, the first business enterprise in what he later built up into Virgin Group. He began compiling a chart from sales at his store and several others; in the interim the BBC and other media used it. Lane, newly hired as the band's manager, promised them he would get their album in the charts, and did so by buying enough copies of it at the Virgin store to make it the bestselling album there and thus put it high in the charts. By the time the strike had ended, the album had started to sell well due to its initial apparent success. It remained on the charts for 34 weeks, selling over a million copies. 

The 1976 Italian reissue of the album differs from the original UK issue in two respects. The title on the front cover is "The Yes" instead of "The Yes Album", although the spine bears the correct title; and the track "The Clap" appears as the third track on the second side.

Reception

The album had a positive reception from critics. John Koegel, writing for Rolling Stone, praised the instrumental unity between Squire, Howe and Kaye, but missed the cover songs present in the band's earlier albums. The album is one of three by Yes to appear in the book 1,000 Recordings to Hear Before You Die. Author Tom Moon preferred the group unity that he felt was missing on later releases and gave a positive impression of Anderson's vocals, saying the melodies in "I've Seen All Good People" were "instantly singable and still somehow deep." The album is also featured in the book 1001 Albums You Must Hear Before You Die.
In 2000 it was voted number 317 in Colin Larkin's All Time Top 1000 Albums.

Anderson was worried about the initial response to the album, but after about a month noticed that fans started singing along at concerts, and concluded that this musical style could be developed and still remain popular. Kaye concluded that overall it was "quite a simple album, considering where Yes went onto from there." Rush singer and bassist Geddy Lee included The Yes Album among his favourite albums. Genesis keyboardist Tony Banks has said it is his favourite Yes album and that he preferred the band when Kaye was a member. "It was the addition of Steve Howe's guitar pyrotechnics that finally allowed Yes to find their true identity. The Yes Album is a giant leap forward," wrote J. D. Considine in The New Rolling Stone Album Guide.

Reissues

The Yes Album was remastered and reissued in 2003 by Rhino Records with several bonus tracks, including a studio version of "Clap", entitled as Howe intended. In 2014, Steven Wilson of Porcupine Tree created a new stereo mix and a 5.1 surround sound mix, available as either a DVD or Blu-ray Disc. It was released on 21 April with bonus tracks including the studio version of "Clap", an extended version of "A Venture", and an alternate version of the album with live tracks, single edits, and an extended mix. The Blu-ray version also features an instrumental version of the album, a needle drop sample of the original vinyl release, and additional live tracks.

Track listing

Personnel
Yes
John Anderson – vocals, percussion
Chris Squire – bass guitars, vocals
Steve Howe – electric and acoustic guitars, vachalia, vocal
Tony Kaye – piano, organ, moog
Bill Bruford – drums, percussion

Additional musician
Colin Goldring – recorder on "I've Seen All Good People" ("Your Move")

Production
Yes and Eddie Offord – production
Eddie Offord – engineering
Brian Lane – co-ordination
Phil Franks – photography
Barry Wentzell – photography
Jon Goodchild – design

Chart performance

Certifications

References
Notes

Citations

Sources

 
 
 
 
 
 
 
 
 
 
 

1971 albums
Albums produced by Eddy Offord
Atlantic Records albums
Yes (band) albums
Proto-prog albums